Semisi Paea (born 17 April 1999) is an Tongan rugby union player, currently playing for the . His preferred position is lock or flanker.

Early career
Paea was born in Tonga but grew up and lives in Rotorua in New Zealand, where he represents Ngongotaha Rugby Club.

Professional career
Paea was named in the  squad for the 2021 Bunnings NPC. At the end of the 2021 season, he was selected for the New Zealand Barbarians. In 2023, he joined the New England Free Jacks for the 2023 Major League Rugby season.

Paea made his debut for Tonga in 2021 against the Cook Islands. He made further appearances for Tonga in the 2022 World Rugby Pacific Nations Cup.

References

External links
itsrugby.co.uk Profile

1999 births
Living people
Tongan rugby union players
Tonga international rugby union players
Rugby union locks
Rugby union flankers
Bay of Plenty rugby union players
New England Free Jacks players